The 1985 LPGA Championship was held May 30 to June 2 at Jack Nicklaus Golf Center at Kings Island in Mason, Ohio, a suburb northeast of Cincinnati.  Played on the Grizzly Course, this was the 31st edition of the LPGA Championship.

Nancy Lopez won the second of her three major titles, all at the LPGA Championship. She led wire-to-wire and finished with a final round 65 (−7) for 273 (−15), eight strokes ahead of runner-up Alice Miller. It was her second consecutive victory of the 

Lopez opened with a first round 65, despite being assessed a two-stroke penalty for slow play. She won her third major on the same course in 1989.

Past champions in the field

Made the cut

Source:

Missed the cut

Source:

Final leaderboard
Sunday, June 2, 1985

Source:

References

External links
Golf Observer leaderboard

Women's PGA Championship
Golf in Ohio
LPGA Championship
LPGA Championship
LPGA Championship
LPGA Championship
LPGA Championship
Women's sports in Ohio